Carlos Rogers may refer to:
Carlos Rogers (American football)
Carlos Rogers (basketball)